Lille OSC won Division 1 season 1953–1954 of the French Association Football League with 47 points.

Participating teams

 Bordeaux
 Le Havre AC
 RC Lens
 Lille OSC
 Olympique de Marseille
 FC Metz
 AS Monaco
 FC Nancy
 OGC Nice
 Nîmes Olympique
 Stade de Reims
 CO Roubaix-Tourcoing
 AS Saint-Etienne
 FC Sète
 FC Sochaux-Montbéliard
 Stade français (football)
 RC Strasbourg
 Toulouse FC

Final table

Promoted from Division 2, who will play in Division 1 season 1954/1955
 Olympique Lyonnais: Champion of Division 2
 AS Troyes-Savinienne: Runner-up
 RC Paris: Third place

Results

Top goalscorers

References
 Division 1 season 1953-1954 at pari-et-gagne.com

Ligue 1 seasons
French
1